This is a list of awards and honours received by Viktor Yanukovych, a Ukrainian political leader who served as both Prime Minister of Ukraine (2002-2005, 2006-2007) and President of Ukraine (2010-2014).

Awards

Ukraine

Foreign

Confessional

Sports organisations
 Olympic Order (2007)
Gold medal of the International Ice Hockey Federation (2003)
Badge of Honor of the National Olympic Committee of Ukraine (2005)
Gold medal and diploma of Ukrainian Premier League (2008)

Honorary titles and honours

Doctorates

Honorary Citizenships

Other honors
A square in the city in of Spitak, Armenia, was named in honor of Yanukovych in 2008.

Yanukovych was recognised as 'Politician of the Year', by the magazine Vedomosti in 2010.

References 

Yanukovych, Viktor
Ukraine politics-related lists
Viktor Yanukovych